Orlando Amêndola (2 November 1899 – 10 May 1974) was an Olympic freestyle swimmer, water polo player, and rower from Brazil, who participated at one Summer Olympics for his native country.

He was an athlete at Clube de Regatas Boqueirão do Passeio, where he practiced swimming, water polo, and rowing.

He started playing polo in 1916 and stood out as a very skilled player. In 1918 he was Rio de Janeiro's champion of the 100 meters freestyle. 

He was one of the first Brazilians who participated at the Olympics. At the 1920 Summer Olympics in Helsinki, the first time that Brazil participated in the Games, he swam the 100-metre freestyle, not reaching the finals. He also participated in the water polo, finishing fourth with the Brazil team. He also participated in rowing.

References

1899 births
1974 deaths
Brazilian male freestyle swimmers
Brazilian male water polo players
Swimmers at the 1920 Summer Olympics
Water polo players at the 1920 Summer Olympics
Olympic swimmers of Brazil
Olympic water polo players of Brazil
Brazilian male rowers